is a Japanese‑Korean anime based on the popular South Korean online game MapleStory. It began airing on October 7, 2007.

Synopsis
Ten years ago, the World Tree that protected peace and order of the world was being targeted by an evil organization called the Black Wings. The Human race led five other races: the powerful warriors, the intelligent magicians, the agile archers, sly thieves and soon after pirates in a fight against the Black Wings. In the end, the World Tree activated self-destruction to protect itself. However, the other races thought it was the Human race that destroyed the World Tree. When the World Tree was destroyed most of the races had nothing left, so a number of them went to Maple Island thinking the ones who stayed would die. They escaped Victoria and lived on Maple Island where living is getting harder and harder. Since then, a never-ending war between the different races began.

Ten years later, the main protagonist, Al, is determined to revive the World Tree. Al and his companions begin their journey to seek the seeds of the World Tree. At the same time, the Black Wings reappear to get the seed first to rule the entire world.

Characters
Al 
The main protagonist of the anime. He's the son of the warrior Grande. He dresses up like a monster because humans are considered enemies to other races, but his true identity was finally revealed to everyone at the end of Episode 4. He likes doing random training and is mainly seen carrying a heavy stone behind him. He is known for his never give-up spirit and always-trying attitude and is quite stubborn at times. He is very determined and will do what's best for his family and friends, even going soforth to help his enemies. Nina and Anji consider Al "gullible", as both of them lied and/or tricked him with ease. His main weapon of choice seems to be the wooden sword that he carries on his back, but later arms himself with Grande's Hero's Gladius, a blade that holds a hidden power of light and purification that only Grande and Al can channel. Occasionally, he will try to ask either Barrow or Gallus to accept him as a student, but is unable to defeat their disciple, or at least the master himself. Nonetheless, both Barrow and Gallus see Al as an "interesting" character. On October 31st, until November 28th (UTC+9), he is portrayed as an NPC located in Henesys in the Japan version of MapleStory for a limited time quest to save the World Tree. He can also be found, seemingly permanently, in the Henesys of the Korean version.

Kino 
Based on the in-game monster Orange Mushroom and has a fondness for Al. He loves to collect shiny stones, but the stones were once mistaken for a World Tree Seed and was thus chased by the Warriors of Seron Perion and the Archers of Seron Henesys. He collects those stones to make a present for his mother. He has a cousin, Kiki, a Blue Mushroom who lives on Victoria Island. In-game, there is also an Orange Mushroom Pet named Kino.

Barrow 
He is the leader of Seron Henesys (Archers) on Maple Island. He fought alongside Al's father, Grande. His character slightly resembles the in-game monsters Meerkat and Lycanthrope. Barrow is equipped with a Maple Soul Searcher. His students mainly include Drumming Bunnies, Fairies, and Turkeys.

Gallus 
The leader of the Seron Perion (Warriors) on Maple Island. His character is based on by the in-game monster Muscle Stone. Gallus is equipped with a Maple Dragon Axe, but often prefers to fight with his fists. His students mainly include Yellow King Goblins, Wooden Masks, and Rocky Masks.

Nina 
The strongest magician in the magician village Seron Ellinia.Also the village chief, but somewhat conceited. In Episode 3, she becomes the second monster to discover Al's identity as a human (the first being Puudou, her Ribbon Pig pet). Nina seems to be reluctant when she meets him but grows to accept him as a friend and to enjoy his company. In the fifth episode, when Anji ran back into Seron Kerning after lying and tricking Al, she stopped him and said that she is the only one who could pull pranks on Al. Also then, Puudou said that a female's jealousy is strong. At the end of the episode she was behind a rock and Puudou said that she should just admit that she can't stand to have her only friend (Al) taken away from someone else and she kicked him saying that he is not her friend. Her weapon of choice seems to be a maple wand. On October 31st, until November 28th (UTC+9), she is portrayed as an NPC located in Sleepywood in the Japan version of MapleStory for a limited time quest to save the World Tree. The in-game mount obtainable through gachapon named Nina's Pentacle is a reference to the flying disc she rides on in the anime.

Puudou 
Nina's pet based on the in-game monster Ribbon Pig. Often bumps into Al while trying to run away from Nina. Puudou was able to sniffle out Al's true identity as a human, therefore making him the first monster to know Al's secret.

Anji 
The leader of the Seron Kerning (Thieves) on Maple Island based on the in-game monster Wild Kargo. He somehow has a connection with Al's father, Grande, as he brought back his Hero's Gladius to Al's mother during the ten years. Anji is considered sly and cunning.

Ariba 
One of the first antagonists that is shown in the anime. He is a member of the Zakums and works for Krone. His character is based on the in-game monster Samiho. Ariba is persistent, constantly chasing Al and his friends assuming they have a World Tree Seed, or at least causing them trouble for the sake of the Zakums.

Krone 
The second antagonist introduced and the one that Ariba works for. Not much is known about her up to this point. Her character resembles the in game monster Lucida. She is constantly trying to find items, including snails, to keep her face soft and moist. She also becomes very angry when she learns that someone is on a date and she is not. Her character is based on the monster Lucinda

Zakteman 
Appears to be the main antagonist of the series. He is the leader of the Zakums. Both Ariba and Krone work for Zakteman. Ten years ago, Zakteman appeared on Victoria Island to steal the power of the World Tree for himself. His character resembles the in-game monster Ergoth.

Gill 
A human who roams in Victoria Island as a monster hunter. He is an extremely powerful swordsman, capable of outmatching both Gallus and Barrow. In actuality, Gill is a Dark Knight and utilizes the Beholden's powers, but uses a sword instead of the typical Spear or Pole Arm fit for such a class. As a monster hunter, he sees all monsters as his enemies and intends to slay them all so humanity can rise above them. Throughout the anime, Al asks that Gill joins him, but refuses, although Gill often shows up when a powerful monster appears and retreats when necessary.

Anime
Madhouse made an adaptation of the massively multiplayer online role-playing game, MapleStory. The anime aired on TXN stations between October 7, 2007 and March 30, 2008. The anime uses three pieces of theme music. "Scratch on the Heart" by Younha is the series' opening theme, while  by Fumiko Orikasa is the series' ending theme. The last episode had "Boku no Rhythm" by Fumiko Orikasa as the ending theme.

Episode listing

References

External links
 MapleAnime.com A website about the Maplestory Anime.
 TV Tokyo Official Website 

2007 Japanese television series debuts
2008 Japanese television series endings
Action anime and manga
Adventure anime and manga
Anime series
Anime television series based on video games
Fantasy anime and manga
Madhouse (company)
MapleStory
TV Tokyo original programming